Marilyn Harris (born July 17, 1924 – December 1, 1999) was an American child actress who appeared in several Hollywood productions in the 1930s and 1940s. She is best remembered for her role as "Little Maria" in the 1931 horror film Frankenstein.

Early life and career
Harris was born in San Fernando, California and placed in a Los Angeles orphanage shortly after her birth. She was adopted by an area couple when she was a month old. Shortly after her adoption, she appeared in a Rin Tin Tin film. In her later years, Harris revealed that her adoptive mother forced her to pursue a screen career because of her own failed attempts to become an actress. Harris also claimed that her mother was physically and emotionally abusive.

In 1931, Harris won the role of "Little Maria" in the horror film Frankenstein. In arguably the film's most memorable scene, Maria meets the fugitive monster (played by Boris Karloff) beside a lake and charms the monster with her innocence, humanity and friendship. These were qualities that he had not experienced with hostile, untrusting adults. A children's game is tragically misinterpreted by the monster, and he throws Little Maria into the lake, unintentionally drowning her and turning the surrounding village's population into a lynch mob, seeking revenge after the child's body is found. The shot of Maria being thrown into the water was cut from original prints, and was restored in the 1980s.

After appearing in Frankenstein, Harris continued her career in small film roles. She left acting at the age of 19 shortly after marrying Wally Watkins, a bouncer she met while working as a cashier at the Hollywood Palladium. The couple had a son the following year. After Harris' husband died in 1981, she remarried. Harris' second husband, Carl, died in 1988. In 1983, 52 years after the film, Harris resumed a friendship with Frankenstein actress Mae Clarke who resided at the Motion Picture & Television Country House and Hospital. Clarke had made a televised request to locate Harris during an interview with LA movie host Tom Hatton.

Death
 
During her final years, Harris struggled with ill health. On December 1, 1999, she died of cancer and heart failure in Los Angeles at the age of 75. At the time of her death, she was the last surviving cast member of Frankenstein.

Filmography

References

External links

 
 

1924 births
1999 deaths
20th-century American actresses
Actresses from Los Angeles
American adoptees
American child actresses
American film actresses
Deaths from cancer in California